Ancistrus cryptophthalmus is a species of catfish in the family Loricariidae. It is a stygobitic species that is native to South America and occurs only in the São Vicente and Angélica-Bezerra cave system in the Paranã River basin, which is part of the Tocantins River drainage in Brazil. The species reaches 6 cm (2.4 inches) SL. Alongside Ancistrus galani and A. formoso, this species displays characteristics unusual among loricariids, such as reduced pigmentation and atrophied eyes, which are adaptations to a subterranean habitat that can be found in various types of cavefish.

References 

Fish described in 1987
cryptophthalmus